Kruszówiec  is a village in the administrative district of Gmina Wiązowna, within Otwock County, Masovian Voivodeship, in east-central Poland.

The village has a population of 73.

References

Villages in Otwock County